Falling Creek UDC Jefferson Davis Highway Marker is a historic stone highway marker located near Richmond, in Chesterfield County, Virginia. It was erected in 1933, and is one of sixteen erected by the United Daughters of the Confederacy in Virginia along the Jefferson Davis Highway between 1927 and 1946.  The marker is a gray granite boulder with rough-cut edges.  The stone is engraved with the text “ERECTED BY THE FIRST DISTRICT VIRGINIA DIVISION UNITED DAUGHTERS OF THE CONFEDERACY 1933.”  It is located in a wayside established in 1934, that provides access to the Bridge at Falling Creek.  It was the first highway wayside park in Virginia.

It was listed on the National Register of Historic Places in 2013.

References

Buildings and structures completed in 1933
Buildings and structures in Chesterfield County, Virginia
Confederate States of America monuments and memorials in Virginia
Individual signs on the National Register of Historic Places
Jefferson Davis Highway
Monuments and memorials on the National Register of Historic Places in Virginia
National Register of Historic Places in Chesterfield County, Virginia
Road transportation buildings and structures on the National Register of Historic Places
Transportation buildings and structures on the National Register of Historic Places in Virginia
United Daughters of the Confederacy monuments and memorials
1933 establishments in Virginia